Lowa is a river in the Congo Basin in northeastern Democratic Republic of the Congo.

It rises in the Mitumba Mountains, on the border of the provinces of South Kivu and North Kivu. It flows westward through the Albertine Rift montane forests and Northeastern Congolian lowland forests of North Kivu and in turn Maniema. It flows into the Lualaba at the border of Maniema and Tshopo.

The first European to trace its length was Gustav Adolf von Götzen in his expedition that started in 1893.

The river basin includes the Kahuzi-Biéga National Park and the Maiko National Park.

Maps

References

Rivers of the Democratic Republic of the Congo
Lualaba River
North Kivu
Maniema